Animal Science was a peer-reviewed scientific journal covering research in animal science, animal biology, and animal production, published by Cambridge University Press. It was the main journal of the British Society of Animal Science and was established in 1959. The last issue was published in 2006 and it was subsequently merged with two other journals to become Animal.

History 
In 1959 the society established the journal as Animal Production. It was published in three issues per year in 1961, and four issues per year in 1971. In 1995, the journal was renamed Animal Science.

In 2000, the editor-in-chief Tony Lawrence retired, with Hilary Davies taking over. According to the Journal Citation Reports, the journal has a 2005 impact factor of 1.071, ranking it 19th out of 44 journals in the category "Agriculture, Dairy & Animal Science".

References

External links 
 

Publications established in 1959
Publications disestablished in 2007
Defunct journals of the United Kingdom
Cambridge University Press academic journals
Bimonthly journals
English-language journals
Animal science journals
Academic journals associated with learned and professional societies of the United Kingdom